Filali or El-Filali is an Arabic surname that denotes a relationship to or from the Tafilalt, Morocco. Notable people with the surname include:
 Abdellatif Filali (1928–2009), Moroccan politician
 Amina El Filali (1996–2012), 16-year-old girl from Larache, Morocco
 Azza Filali (born 1952), Tunisian gastroenterologist
 Mohammed El Filali, Moroccan football forward
 Mustapha Filali (1921–2019), Tunisian politician
 Tayeb Filali (born 1979), Algerian long-distance runner

References 

Arabic-language surnames
Surnames of Moroccan origin